Atkinson County High School is located in Pearson, Georgia, United States. It is the only high school in the Atkinson County School District. Its teams are known as the Rebels. It shares a campus with its feeder school, Atkinson County Middle School.

References

External links
 
 Atkinson County School System

Public high schools in Georgia (U.S. state)